Atlas Educational Film Company was a film production business in Chicago, Illinois. It had a production studio at 1111 South Boulevard in Oak Park, a former theater building designed by E. E. Roberts. It is still standing. Addresses for the company were also listed as 3 Wabash Avenue and 63 East Adams Street. Atlas was also a dealer of portable projectors, slides, and offered a catalog of educational slides and films.

C. A. Rehm was the company's secretary and a film was contracted for the building of his model home.

In 1914 it was reported to be part of Atlas School Supply and offered "motion picture services" to schools and colleges. It advertised projector sales as well as educational films and slides. In 1914 it was using 35 mm film.

In 1918, the company was contracted to film a demonstration tour of power trucks.

One of their movie soundtracks, titled "Radio magic", was recorded on wax cylinder by Victor Records.

The Cleveland Public Library has a publication from the company titled Answers from Atlas. The Smithsonian Institution holds a collection of trade catalogs issued by the company.

Filmography
Along the Green Bay Trail (1922), extant
Enemies of Youth (1925)
My Home Town (1925), appears to be a film promoting Beloit that was part of a  business promotion campaign in the city
Making Blue Prints
Elisha and the Shunnamite, portraying a biblical story
The Drill Press
Bar Work; Magnesium Part 1, United States Office of Education training video about use of a turret lathe
Bar Work; Magnesium Part 2, film about lathing magnesium
Bar Work; Part 3 (1945)
First Impressions, Navy Department training video on new employee orientation best practices
Discipline (1943), U.S. Navy training video
North Carolina Pictorial History
Student Flyer (1944)
500,000 to 1 (1954), extant film  documenting the battle against bugs and promoting insecticide

References

Film production companies of the United States